Jumma  Khan Marri (Balochi: جمعه خان  مری) is a senior Baloch political activist from Balochistan. He was formerly a member of Baloch separatist groups.

In February 2018, Marri stated that he and his followers have left the separatists groups. He and his followers pledged their allegiance towards Pakistan and established 'Overseas Pakistani Balochi Unity' (OPBU) for the Baloch people living abroad. He stated that "sacrificed everything for a movement which turned out to be fundamentally faulty and empty from within". He also claimed that BLF and Baloch freedom struggle was hijacked by India. Marri insists that India is behind the unrest in Balochistan. He disclosed that if India stops the money supplies, the insurgency will end the next day.

Personal life
Jumma Khan Marri is the son of Mir Hazar Khan Marri. His father, Mir Hazar Khan Marri was the head of Bajarani Marri tribe. Jumma Khan's home town is in Kholu. In 1986, Jumma Khan went to Moscow to pursue higher education, where he acquired his degree in Medicines at Russian State Medical University and later obtained PhD in Immunology and Allergies in 1998.

Activities
In 1964, Jumma Khan Marri founded Baloch Liberation Front (BLF) in Damascus, Syria. Marri controlled BLF since its inception and it is unclear when he stepped down as the leader of the outfit.

In an interview with Russian news channel, Marri stated that he was the one who designed the 'free Balochistan flag'. He stated that he was among those people who were always on the forefront of Baloch freedom struggle. Marri said that he left Balochistan in 1979 and settled in Afghanistan along with his family. He stated that he has been in self imposed exile in Moscow since 2000. Moreover, he said that he "sacrificed everything for a movement which turned out to be fundamentally faulty and empty from within".

Overseas Pakistan Baloch Unity (OPBU)
On 17 February 2018, Marri stated that he and his followers have left the separatist groups. He said that he is launching 'Overseas Pakistani Balochi Community' for the Baloch living aboard. The purpose of new organisation will be to confront and expose the "evil design" of people like "Brahamdagh Bugti, Hyrbiyar Marri and Mehran Marri". He states that Brahamdagh Bugti, Hyrbiyar Marri and Mehran Marri "are on the Indian payroll”. Marri announced his separation from separatist groups while attending a 'Pakistan Unity Day' event in Moscow.

Marri's decision to leave separatist groups was welcomed in Balochistan. A huge gathering took place in Kholu, Balochistan to welcome  Marri's decision. Speaking from Moscow, Marri thanked people of Pakistan especially his supporters in Kholu for arranging such a big gathering to welcome his decision. He also asked the Balochs who are fighting against the state to lay down their weapons and start supporting development activities in the province. He stated that Indian funded so-called Baloch leaders were enjoying luxurious life in Europe while common Baloch was suffering from terrorism and violence. The gathering to welcome Marri's decision took place in Kholu which was once a stronghold of Baloch Liberation Army (BLA).

During an interview with Russian News channel, Marri stated that India is behind the unrest in Balochistan. He disclosed that if India stops the money supplies, the insurgency will end the next day. He said that majority of Baloch people have no problem with Pakistan. They have questions to the government just like every other normal citizen have for their government in their country around the world.

In September 2018, Marri visited Brussels where he held meetings with European Institutions for the awareness about the misuse of Human Rights Conventions by the terrorists. Marri told media in Brussels that 'during his meeting with European Institutions, he cautioned the policy makers about misuse of asylum by some terrorist from Balochistan under the pretext of human rights'. Some European countries have already rejected asylum to several Baloch leaders because of misuse of various forums to cause unrest among Baloch diaspora and in Balochistan.

While during his stay in Brussels, Marri also met with Baloch community in Europe to gain their support and to bring the misguided groups on the right track. Marri said that some Baloch are being allured by 'outside forces' in the name of nationalism which is only worsening the socio-economic plight of Baloch people. Marri also disclosed that he was offered funding from spy agencies of several countries to organize insurgencies in Balochistan, but over time he realized the real motive, which was to destabilize Balochistan. Such uprisings does not bring any dividends to people. 

During his speech in United Nations Human Rights Council (UNHRC) in Geneva in 2019, Marri said that Pakistani law enforcement agencies had apprehended an Indian naval commander in Balochistan who confessed that India was behind unrest in the province. Marri also said that thousands of innocent people have been killed in Pakistan because of India's terrorist network who use Afghanistan as base to conduct their attacks.

On China–Pakistan Economic Corridor (CPEC), Marri state that development of Gwadar Port, road networks and alternate power projects could offer great opportunities to Baloch people.

See also
 Dad Shah
 Balochistan Liberation Army
 Baloch Students Organization
 Baloch Students Organization- Awami
 Baluchi Autonomist Movement

References

Baloch nationalists
Living people
Balochistan
Pakistani emigrants to Russia
Pakistani emigrants to the Soviet Union
Pakistani expatriates in Afghanistan
Year of birth missing (living people)